Mules and Mortgages is a 1919 American silent comedy film featuring Oliver Hardy.

Cast
 Jimmy Aubrey as Jim
 Maude Emory as Girl, under the threat of eviction
 Oliver Hardy as Strongarm (as Babe Hardy)
 Snooky as Minnie, a Chimp (as Snookums the Chimpanzee)

See also
 List of American films of 1919
 Oliver Hardy filmography

External links

1919 films
1919 short films
American silent short films
American black-and-white films
1919 comedy films
Silent American comedy films
American comedy short films
1910s American films